The Ernest Baxter Fite House is a historic residence in Hamilton, Alabama.  Designed by Weatherly Carter, who had designed what later became the Alabama Governor's Mansion, the house was built in 1927–1928 for Ernest Baxter Fite, then a member of the Alabama House of Representatives and a former state senator.  Ernest's son, Rankin Fite, served two terms as Speaker of the state House.

The house was built of brick in a Colonial Revival style.  Four doric columns frame the front portico.  The main entrance is in the right third of the portico.  The house contains 17 rooms split between 2 floors, including 6 bedrooms.  It was listed on the Alabama Register of Landmarks and Heritage in 1992 and the National Register of Historic Places in 1997.

References

Colonial Revival architecture in Alabama
Houses in Marion County, Alabama
Houses completed in 1928
National Register of Historic Places in Marion County, Alabama
Houses on the National Register of Historic Places in Alabama
Properties on the Alabama Register of Landmarks and Heritage